Enniscorthy was a constituency represented in the Irish House of Commons until its abolition on 1 January 1801.

History
In the Patriot Parliament of 1689 summoned by James II, Enniscorthy was represented with two members.

Members of Parliament, 1613–1801
 1613–1615 Sir Edward Fisher and Richard Perkins
 1634–1635 Sir Arthur Loftus and Thomas Newcomen
 1639–1649 William Swanton and Ralph Waddington (unseated and replaced by Sir Thomas Esmond, 1st Baronet, (expelled 1642))
 1661 Timothy Stampe and James Napper (Napper AWOL and replaced in 1662 by George Carleton)

1689–1801

Notes

References

Bibliography

Constituencies of the Parliament of Ireland (pre-1801)
Enniscorthy
Historic constituencies in County Wexford
1613 establishments in Ireland
1800 disestablishments in Ireland
Constituencies established in 1613
Constituencies disestablished in 1800